Oliver Beeck (born 1988) is an American football Offensive Lineman, Center for the Kiel Baltic Hurricanes of the German Football League.

Football career

Oliver Beeck began playing football with the Kiel Baltic Hurricanes in 1998. He won the German championship, German Bowl, in 2010.

2011 IFAF World Cup

Oliver Beeck was named on the roster for the German national team for the 2011 IFAF World Cup in Austria.

External links
Kiel Baltic Hurricanes bio

Living people
German players of American football
1988 births
Place of birth missing (living people)